Bukavu is a city in eastern Democratic Republic of the Congo (DRC), lying at the extreme south-western edge of Lake Kivu, west of Cyangugu in Rwanda, and separated from it by the outlet of the Ruzizi River.  It is the capital of the South Kivu province and as of 2012 it had an estimated population of 806,940.

In 2021 it has an estimated urban population of 1,133,000.

History 

Bukavu is part of the ancient territory of Bushi Kingdom, an ethnic group of South-Kivu. It was governed by a "Muluzi" Nyalukemba, when the first Arabs, then the European arrived in Bushi at the end of the 19th century. 'Muluzi' or 'Baluzi' in the plural means 'the nobleman' or 'nobility' to Shi. Before the Europeans came in Bushi Kingdom, Bukavu was called "Rusozi". The name Bukavu comes from the transformation of word 'bu 'nkafu ' (farm of cows) in Mashi, the language of Bashi. Bukavu was established in 1901 by the Belgian colonial authorities. Originally named Bukavu, it was named "Costermansville" (in French) or "Costermansstad" (in Dutch) in 1927, after Vice Governor-General Paul Costermans. In 1953, it was changed back to Bukavu. It had a prominent European population under colonial rule. They were attracted by the subtropical climate (Lake Kivu is 1,500 metres above sea level) and scenic location (Bukavu is built on five peninsulas and has been described as "a green hand, dipped in the lake").  Many colonial villas have gardens sloping down to the shore.

By contrast, the main residential district for ordinary people, Kadutu, climbs up the hillside inland. The surrounding hills reach a height of 2,000 metres. Formerly an administrative centre for the whole of the Kivu region, the town lost some of its status as a result of the growth of Goma and the wars that erupted in the Congo following the Genocide in Rwanda.

Following the Rwandan genocide, Hutu refugees and many members of the former Hutu-led government fled as part of the Great Lakes refugee crisis. The refugee camps around Goma and Bukavu became a center of the Hutu insurgency from the camps against the new Watutsi government of Rwanda, although to a very minimal extent. In November 1996 at the start of the First Congo War, Rwandan government forces consequently attacked the Hutu camps, and forces of the then Zaire government which allowed the insurgency. The Rwandan government supported rebels in Zaire led by Laurent Kabila who overthrew the Kinshasa government with their help. Later, the Rwandan government fell out with the rebels, which lead to the Second Congo War. Rwanda supported the rebel Rally for Congolese Democracy (RCD) against Kabila. The reason for this support is believed to be economic rather than the protection of the Rwandan territory. Bukavu with the rest of Sud-Kivu saw sporadic fighting between rebels and government forces and their proxies, including the Mayi-Mayi, especially in 1998 and 2004.

On June 3, 2004, protestors in several Congolese cities took to the streets to demonstrate against the United Nations for failing to prevent Bukavu from falling to Rwandan-backed RCD forces led by General Nkunda. About 16,000 women were raped on a single weekend after General Nkunda told his troops "This city is yours for three days." Nkunda was later persuaded to fall in line with the peace accords which ended the war and re-integrate his troops with the Congolese government forces. In September 2007 he rebelled again and started attacking government troops north of Goma.

During the 2015 South Kivu earthquake, at least one policeman was killed.

The city was damaged by the 2022 Bukavu floods.

Geography 

Although not threatened by volcanoes as Goma is, Bukavu is equally in danger from a potential limnic eruption from Lake Kivu, in which vast quantities of dissolved carbon dioxide and methane could explode from the lake and threaten the lives of the 2 million people who live near the lake.<ref>"Killer Lakes." BBC Two Thursday 4 April 2002, summarised at www.bbc.co.uk.</ref>

 Climate 
Köppen-Geiger climate classification system classifies Bukavu's climate as tropical savanna (Aw''), although it is milder than most climates of its type due to high altitude. Bukavu sees very warm days and pleasant nights year round.

Architecture

The city has over 100 art deco buildings which were constructed during Belgian colonial rule and proposals have been made to preserve these so that the city can be a tourist attraction for architecture enthusiasts.

Transport 
Bukavu is an important transport hub and gateway to eastern DR Congo, but as a result of the wars the road network has deteriorated and highways to Goma, Kisangani and other towns have not been fully restored.  As with Goma, close proximity to the paved road network of East Africa and the functioning eastern section of the Trans-African Highway to Mombasa may allow a faster recovery than other Congolese towns. Bukavu's proximity to the Lake Tanganyika ports of Bujumbura and Kalundu-Uvira give it an additional advantage, with access on the lake to the railheads of Kigoma (linked to Dar es Salaam) and Kalemie (rail link to Katanga, in need of rehabilitation). Isolation, largely due to bad road infrastructure, has been found to be an important determinant of wealth and/or development in South Kivu.

Bukavu has numerous lakeside wharves and boat transport is used extensively in the Congolese waters of the lake in the absence of well maintained roads.

Kavumu Airport (ICAO code: FZMA, IATA code: BKY) located about 30 kilometres north is the domestic airport for Bukavu. This airport has not been renovated for many years. The renovation of this airport will be a great relief to the region and will facilitate many business and the growth of the economy.

Education 
There are many schools and universities present in Bukavu. The city also is known to be one that gives good education in D. R. Congo.

Université Catholique de Bukavu, Université Évangélique en Afrique. The Official University of Bukavu was founded in 1993.

Parks

Kahuzi-Biéga National Park, a World Heritage Site and one of two homes of the eastern lowland gorilla, is close to the city and can be reached from the road to Kavumu.  The park headquarters at Tshivanga is located 31 km from Bukavu.

Places of worship 
Among the places of worship, they are predominantly Christian churches and temples : Roman Catholic Archdiocese of Bukavu (Catholic Church), Kimbanguist Church, Baptist Community of Congo (Baptist World Alliance), Baptist Community of the Congo River (Baptist World Alliance), Assemblies of God, Province of the Anglican Church of the Congo (Anglican Communion), Presbyterian Community in Congo (World Communion of Reformed Churches). There are also Muslim mosques.

Medical care

The city is home to the Panzi Hospital. Founded by the Swedish Pentecostal Mission in 1921, its director Denis Mukwege operates on women who survive sexual violence, and is one of two doctors in the eastern Congo qualified to perform a reconstructive surgery.

Panzi Hospital is a teaching hospital of the Evangelical University in Africa. Bukavu is also home to the Catholic University of Bukavu's School of Medicine and General Reference teaching hospital. The pharmaceutical factory Pharmakina owned by a German immigrant and a French immigrant produces the antimalarial drug quinine and the generic AIDS medicament Afri-vir. Pharmakina also runs an AIDS diagnostic and treatment center. With 740 employees and about 1000 free-lance workers. After Great Lake Plantations SARL, which is Congo's only modern tea manufacturing company, Pharmakina is the largest employer in town.

Social issues
Women continue to face major problems of violence in the wake of war in the eastern DRC. Fondation chirezi in August 2007 launched a project for women's trauma healing and care, based in Bukavu.

Another NGO launched a program to help women affected by Violence in Panzi next to Fondation Panzi called V-Day.

After all the repeated wars in the east of the Democratic Republic of Congo, the number of people living with disabilities has increased considerably. A national non-profit association called Congo Handicap was created in 2004 in this city to support people living with disabilities. Comprehensive care for this segment of the population, including even people living with disabilities who were raped during the war.

Notable residents

 
 Caddy Adzuba
 Alexis Brimeyer
 Cor Akim
 Solange Lusiku Nsimire
 Solange Lwashiga Furaha
 Vital Kamerhe
 
 Jeannette Kavira Mapera
 Yolande Mabika
 Saïd Makasi
 Popole Misenga
 Denis Mukwege
 Léon Mamboleo
 Francine Muyumba
 Mwezé Ngangura
 Douce Namwezi N'Ibamba
 Kakengwa Pikinini
 Raoul Shungu
 Stephanos of Tallinn
 Jean van de Velde (director)

References

Sources

 UN Department for Humanitarian Affairs, Inter-Regional Information Network briefings IRIN

Bibliography

External links 

 
 Map 
  Worldwide Bukavu Community Website
  Spiegel-Online article
  Panzi Hospital of Bukavu
 3tamis - website of Bukavu and its area
 Pictures of Bukavu, previously Costermansville

 
Populated places established in 1901
Populated places in South Kivu
Populated places on Lake Kivu
Ruzizi River
1901 establishments in the Congo Free State